Daitari is a census town in Kendujhar district  in the state of Odisha, India.

Geography
It has an average elevation of 550 metres (1804 feet).

Demographics
 India census, Daitari had a population of 4239. Males constitute 54% of the population and females 46%. Daitari has an average literacy rate of 69%, higher than the national average of 59.5%: male literacy is 78% and, female literacy is 60%. In Daitari, 11% of the population is under 6 years of age.

References

Cities and towns in Kendujhar district